Trans-Canada Air Lines (also known as TCA in English, and Trans-Canada in French) was a Canadian airline that operated as the country's flag carrier, with corporate headquarters in Montreal, Quebec. Its first president was Gordon Roy McGregor. Founded in 1937, it was renamed Air Canada in 1965.

History
With heavy involvement from C. D. Howe, a senior minister in the Mackenzie King cabinet, TCA was created by the Crown Corporation Canadian National Railway (CNR), and launched its first flight on 1 September 1937, on a flight between Vancouver and Seattle. An air-mail contract with Royal Mail Canada was one of the methods by which TCA was financed.

The creation of TCA was partly by CNR management who wanted to expand the company into the new field of passenger aviation, and was partly by government direction. Prior to TCA, no large national airline existed in Canada. With war looming, and other nations (primarily the U.S.) experiencing major increases in the creation of passenger airlines, it was necessary to have a presence. The CNR was the country's largest corporation at the time and proved an effective vehicle for the government to create a national airline.

TCA was also in direct competition with passenger trains operated by parent CNR, and contributed to the decline of passenger rail service as Canada entered the pioneering years of air travel. In response to CNR's creation of TCA, arch-rival Canadian Pacific Railway created Canadian Pacific Air Lines in 1942.

Between 1943 and 1947, TCA operated the Canadian Government Trans-Atlantic Air Service (CGTAS) to provide trans-Atlantic military passenger and postal delivery service using Avro Lancastrian (modified Avro Lancaster) aircraft.  The record crossing was completed non-stop in 12:26 hours; the average was about 13:25 hours. CGTAS ushered in the era of commercial air travel across the North Atlantic.  After the war, the Lancastrians became part of TCA and carried paying civilian passengers until they were replaced by Douglas DC-4s.

Postwar

Starting in 1945, TCA acquired 30 twin-engined ex-military Douglas DC-3s for use on Canadian internal services and some of these remained in service until 1963 on shorter routes. A fleet of Merlin-powered Canadair North Stars was delivered from 1947 and these commenced services to several European countries, including the United Kingdom and to cities in the U.S. The last of the North Stars was sold in 1961.

The Canadair North Stars were gradually replaced by longer range Lockheed Super Constellations from 1954 onwards, fourteen being operated on transatlantic routes extending as far as Vienna in Austria; also to Bermuda and several Caribbean destinations including Jamaica and Trinidad. The last Super Constellations were disposed of in 1963. A large fleet of Vickers Viscount turboprop airliners was built up from late 1954 and these were used on many intra-North American routes.  The Viscount was followed by the larger Vickers Vanguard turboprop.  TCA was the only airline in North America to operate the Vanguard in scheduled passenger service.

In 1953 with the development of ReserVec (originally called Gemini), TCA became the first airline in the world to use a computer reservation system with remote terminals.

The airline's Winnipeg maintenance shops and its first trial flight of the Viscount was documented in the 1955 film, Routine Flight.

The airline acquired a fleet of Douglas DC-8 jet airliners powered by Rolls-Royce Conways, the first being received on 25 May 1960. The DC-8 quickly replaced the slower Super Constellations on TCA's scheduled services to Europe.

Changes
In 1964, an Act of Parliament proposed by Jean Chrétien changed the name of Trans-Canada Air Lines to "Air Canada", which was already in use as the airline's French-language name, effective 1 January 1965.  In 1978, Air Canada was divested by parent CNR and became a separate Crown corporation.  Air Canada was privatized in 1989.

Destinations
TCA operated a network of 160 routes to destinations including:

 St. John's, Newfoundland
 Stephenville, Newfoundland
 Gander, Newfoundland
 Halifax, Nova Scotia
 Sydney, Nova Scotia
 Fredericton, New Brunswick
 Victoria, British Columbia
 Vancouver, British Columbia
 Penticton, British Columbia
 Boston, Massachusetts
 New York City, New York
 Winnipeg, Manitoba
 Brandon, Manitoba
 Calgary, Alberta
 Chicago, Illinois
 Cleveland, Ohio
 Edmonton, Alberta
 Lethbridge, Alberta
 Montreal, Quebec
 Ottawa, Ontario
 London, Ontario
 Tampa, Florida
 Toronto, Ontario
 Detroit (Windsor)
 Seattle, Washington
 London, England
 Paris, France
 Prestwick, Scotland
 Shannon, Ireland
 Düsseldorf, Germany
 St. George's Parish, Bermuda
 Nassau, Bahamas
 Kingston, Jamaica
 Christ Church, Barbados
 Piarco, Trinidad

Fleet

Aircraft on display
One former TCA Lockheed L-1049G Super Constellation (CF-TGE), has been preserved by The Museum of Flight in Seattle, Washington. It is currently on display at the Museum's "Airpark" attraction.

A former TCA Vickers Viscount (CF-THG) is on display at the British Columbia Aviation Museum in Sidney, British Columbia. The aircraft has been completely refurbished by the museum.

Accidents and incidents
Trans-Canada Air Lines had 13 aircraft accidents resulting in hull losses, with a total of 248 fatalities, between 1938 and 1963. These included:

See also
 List of defunct airlines of Canada
 Canadian National Railway
 Canadian Airways
 Canadian Airlines
 History of aviation in Canada
 ReserVec

References
Notes

Bibliography

 Blatherwick, John. A History of Airlines in Canada. Toronto: The Unitrade Press, 1989. .
 Bliss, Michael. Northern Enterprise: Five Centuries of Canadian Business. Toronto: McClelland and Stewart, 1994, 1990, First edition 1987. .
 Harbron, John D.  C.D. Howe (The Canadians).  Don Mills, Ontario: Fitzhaven and Whiteside Limited, 1980.  .
 Marson, P.J. The Lockheed Constellation Series. Tunbridge, Kent, UK: Air-Britain (Historians) Ltd, 1982. .
 Pigott, Peter. National Treasure: The History of Trans Canada Airlines. Madeira Park, BC: Harbour Publishing, 2001. .
 Render, Shirley. Double Cross: The Inside Story of James A. Richardson and the Canadian Airways. Vancouver: Douglas & McIntyre, 1999. .
 Smith, Philip. It Seems Like Only Yesterday: Air Canada, the First 50 Years. Toronto: McClelland and Stewart, 1986. .
 Whittle, John A. et al. The Douglas DC-4 and Canadair 4. Tonbridge, Kent, UK: Air-Britain (Historians) Ltd, 1967.

External links

 
Aviation history of Canada
Defunct airlines of Canada
Airlines established in 1937
Airlines disestablished in 1964
Air Canada
Canadian Aviation Hall of Fame inductees
Former Crown corporations of Canada
Canadian National Railway subsidiaries
Canadian companies established in 1937
1937 establishments in Quebec
1964 establishments in Quebec
Government-owned airlines